The third edition of the European Race Walking Cup took place in the German city of Eisenhüttenstadt on Saturday June 17 and Sunday June 18, 2000.  For the first time, 10 km races for junior athletes (U20) were held.
Complete results were published. The junior events are documented on the World Junior Athletics History webpages.  Medal winners were published on the Athletics Weekly website,

Medallists

Abbreviations
All times shown are in hours:minutes:seconds

Men's results

20 km walk
Held on Saturday June 17, 2000.

Team (20 km Men)

50 km walk
Held on Sunday June 18, 2000.

Team (50 km Men)

Junior 10 km walk
Only the first ten are listed below

Team (10 km Junior Men)

Women's results

20 km walk
Held on Saturday June 17, 2000.

Team (20 km Women)

Junior 10 km walk
Only the first ten are listed below

Team (10 km Junior Women)

Participation
The participation of 278 athletes (175 men/103 women) from 26 countries is reported.

 (18)
 (1)
 (9)
 (3)
 (9)
 (18)
 (17)
 (13)
 (14)
 (6)
 (15)
 (10)
 (9)
 (2)
 (6)
 (10)
 (10)
 (8)
 (17)
 (16)
 (17)
 (9)
 (11)
 (11)
 (16)
 Yugoslavia (3)

See also
2000 Race Walking Year Ranking

References

External links
IAAF Men's 2000 Year Ranking
IAAF Women's 2000 Year Ranking
gbrathletics
athletix

2000
Race Walking
Race Walking
International athletics competitions hosted by Germany